MSSM may refer to:

 Maine School of Science and Mathematics
 Minimal Supersymmetric Standard Model
 Mount Sinai School of Medicine
 Master of Science degree in Systems Management